Live Forever – The Album is the fourth studio album by Swedish nu-disco artist Magnus Carlsson. The album was released on 4 July 2007 and peaked at number 8 on the Swedish charts.

Track listing
Crazy Summer Nights
I Won't Cry
Waves of Love
Nothing's Real
Another Rainbow
Give a Little Love
Never Walk Away
Live Forever
I Need Your Love
Don't You Worry
You
Boogie Time
Live Forever (acoustic studio version)

Charts

Release history

References

2007 albums
Magnus Carlsson albums